A sharpshooter  is a person who is highly skilled in shooting. It may also refer to:

Films
 Sharpshooters (film), a 1938 American film
 Sharpshooter (2007 film), starring James Remar
 Sharp Shooter (film), a 2015 Indian Kannada-language film
 Sharpshooter (2021 film), a Chinese film

Ships
 , various Royal Navy ships
 Sharpshooter-class torpedo gunboat, a 19th century Royal Navy class

Songs
 "Sharpshooter", a song by Whitford/St. Holmes from their album Whitford/St. Holmes
 "Sharpshooter (Best of the Best)", a song by Rascalz from their album Global Warning

Sports
 Sharpshooter (professional wrestling), a wrestling submission hold
 Louie Espinoza (born 1962), American former featherweight boxer nicknamed "Sharpshooter"

Other uses
 Sharpshooter (insect), a specific species of leafhoppers
 Sharpshooter, a narrow spade